Enea AB is a global information technology company with its headquarters in Kista, Sweden that provides real-time operating systems and consulting services. Enea, which is an abbreviation of Engmans Elektronik Aktiebolag, also produces the OSE operating system.

History
Enea was founded 1968 by Rune Engman as Engmans Elektronik AB.  Their first product was an operating system for a defence computer used by the Swedish Air Force.  During the 1970s the firm developed compiler technology for the Simula programming language.

During the early days of the European Internet-like connections, Enea employee Björn Eriksen connected Sweden to EUnet using UUCP, and registered enea as the first Swedish domain in April 1983.  The domain was later converted to the internet domain enea.se when the network was switched over to TCP and the Swedish top domain .se was created in 1986.

Products

OSE

The ENEA OSE real-time operating system first released in 1985.

The Enea multi core family of real-time operating systems was first released in 2009.

The Enea Operating System Embedded (OSE) is a family of real-time, microkernel, embedded operating system created by Bengt Eliasson for ENEA AB, which at the time was collaborating with Ericsson to develop a multi-core system using Assembly, C, and C++. Enea OSE Multicore Edition is based on the same microkernel architecture. The kernel design that combines the advantages of both traditional asymmetric multiprocessing (AMP) and symmetric multiprocessing (SMP). Enea OSE Multicore Edition offers both AMP and SMP processing in a hybrid architecture. OSE supports many processors, mainly 32-bit. These include the ColdFire, ARM, PowerPC, and MIPS based system on a chip (SoC) devices.

The Enea OSE family features three OSs: OSE (also named OSE Delta) for processors by ARM, PowerPC, and MIPS, OSEck for various DSP's, and OSE Epsilon for minimal devices, written in pure assembly (ARM, ColdFire, C166, M16C, 8051). OSE is a closed-source proprietarily licensed software released on 20 March 2018. OSE uses events (or signals) in the form of messages passed to and from processes in the system. Messages are stored in a queue attached to each process. A link handler mechanism allows signals to be passed between processes on separate machines, over a variety of transports. The OSE signalling mechanism formed the basis of an open-source inter-process kernel design project named LINX.

Linux
Enea Linux provides an open, cross-development tool chain and runtime environment based on the Yocto Project embedded Linux configuration system.

Hypervisor
Enea Hypervisor is also based on OSE microkernel technology and runs Enea OSE applications and takes as guests Linux Operating System and optionally semiconductor specific executive environments for bare-metal speed packet processing

Optima
Enea Optima development tool suite for developing, debugging, and profiling embedded systems software

The Element
The Element middleware software for high-availability systems, based on technology developed by Equipe Communications Corp

Collaborative project and community memberships
Enea is a member of various collaborative projects and open source communities:
 Linux Foundation
 Automotive Grade Linux
 Linux OPNFV
 Yocto Project
 Linaro
 Open Data Plane (ODP)

References

Information technology companies of Sweden
Companies based in Stockholm
Real-time operating systems
Embedded operating systems
ARM operating systems
Microkernel-based operating systems